Lac Trévet Water Aerodrome  is located on Lac Trévet, Quebec, Canada. It is open from mid-May until October.

References

Transport Canada - Canadian Aerodromes 

Registered aerodromes in Abitibi-Témiscamingue
Seaplane bases in Quebec